AK81 is a street gang in Denmark. It is a support gang (called puppet clubs by law enforcement) of the Hells Angels, but members are not required to own a motorcycle or wear a patch. Because of this, and due to high-running racial tensions, they are recruiting much faster than the Hells Angels in Denmark. AK stands for "Altid Klar", which is Danish for Always Ready, and 81 is synonymous with the letters HA. The gang was formed in 2007 to combat The International Club and other immigrant street gangs in a feud over the lucrative illegal hashish market. This means that they essentially provide muscle for the Hells Angels. Police estimate that they have around three hundred members.

On August 14, 2008, Osman Nuri Dogan, a 19-year-old ethnic kurd was shot and killed by an AK81 member in Tingbjerg. Later that year, on October 8, there was a shoot-out between AK81 members and a group of immigrants in Nørrebro, Copenhagen, during which one man was injured. An AK81 man began shooting at a group of immigrant gang members, who took cover before calling for back-up who arrived carrying guns. The next day, immigrant gang members attacked AK81 members in Odense which led to the police arresting fourteen people. The violence has also gone beyond the streets and into prisons. In August 2009, a mass brawl between immigrant gangs and Hells Angels broke out at Vridsløselille Prison. And on August 12, 2009, three men linked to AK81 and the Hells Angels were jailed for beating up two immigrants at a club in Hellerup in April of that year.

References

Society of Denmark
Gangs in Denmark
Hells Angels
Street gangs